Lake Vistonida (older form: Βιστωνίς) is a lake in Porto Lagos, Xanthi regional unit, Greece. It encompasses a unique ecosystem and the local climate can be described as mid-Mediterranean. It hosts a variety of fauna, which comprise several types of fish, amphibians, reptiles, mammals, birds as well as flora.

History 
In antiquity, the lake was called "Bistonis (Βιστονίς λίμνη), a great Thracian lake in the country of the Bistones, from whom it derived its name. The water of the lake was brackish and abounded in fish. The fourth part of its produce is said to have been granted by the emperor Arcadius to the convent of Vatopedi on Mount Athos. The river Cossinites emptied itself into the lake Bistonis, which at one time overflowed the neighbouring country and swept away several Thracian towns."

See also
 Bistonis, the nymph who lived in that lake with her people
 Bistoni, the Thracians who lived near the lake

Bibliography

References

External links

Vistonida
Landforms of Xanthi (regional unit)
Landforms of Rhodope (regional unit)
Landforms of Eastern Macedonia and Thrace
Natura 2000 in Greece